Kaco (Kachok) is an Austro-Asiatic language of Vietnam. The two dialects, Kaco and Romam, are quite distinct.  Lamam (Lmam) is a clan name found among the Kaco', not a distinct language.

In Vietnam, Romam (Rơ-măm) is spoken in Le village, Mo Rai commune, Sa Thầy District, Kon Tum province (Đặng, et al. 2010:115).

References

Magaspag, Chitse E. 2012. Language Use and Attitudes of Kachok Speakers: Towards an Assessment of the Kachok Language Vitality. SIL International.

Bahnaric languages